The 2019 Russian Men's Curling Cup was held from December 2nd to December 6th at the Ice Cube Curling Center arena in Sochi.

All games played are 8 ends.

All times are listed in Moscow Time (UTC+03:00)

Teams

Round robin results and standings

Group A

Group B

Playoffs

Semifinals
December 6, 10:00 am

Third place
December 6, 3:00 pm

Final
December 6, 3:00 pm

Final standings

References

External links

See also
2019 Russian Women's Curling Cup

Russian Men's Curling Cup
Russian Men's Curling Cup
Men's Curling Cup
Russian Men's Curling Cup
Sports competitions in Sochi